The 1990–91 New York Islanders season was the 19th season for the franchise in the National Hockey League (NHL).

Offseason

Regular season
The Islanders finished the regular-season last in scoring (223 goals for), tied the Quebec Nordiques for fewest power-play goals scored (51) and had the fewest power-play opportunities (317).

Final standings

Schedule and results

Playoffs
The Islanders missed the playoffs for the first time since 1989 despite qualifying the previous year in the 1989-90 season.

Player statistics

Note: Pos = Position; GP = Games played; G = Goals; A = Assists; Pts = Points; +/- = plus/minus; PIM = Penalty minutes; PPG = Power-play goals; SHG = Short-handed goals; GWG = Game-winning goals
      MIN = Minutes played; W = Wins; L = Losses; T = Ties; GA = Goals-against; GAA = Goals-against average; SO = Shutouts; SA = Shots against; SV = Shots saved; SV% = Save percentage;

Awards and records

Transactions

Draft picks
New York's draft picks at the 1990 NHL Entry Draft held at the BC Place in Vancouver, British Columbia.

Farm teams

See also
 1990–91 NHL season

References

External links

New York Islanders seasons
New York Islanders
New York Islanders
New York Islanders
New York Islanders